Adrian Woźniczka (born August 14, 1982) is a Polish footballer who plays for Apis Jędrzychowice.

Career

Club
In June 2005, he joined Kujawiak Włocławek (from Spring 2006 Zawisza Bydgoszcz) on a one-year deal.

In Summer 2006, he moved to Polonia Warszawa.

In March 2007, he signed a contract with KSZO Ostrowiec.

In July 2007, he moved to ŁKS Łódź.

In June 2011, he joined Miedź Legnica.

References

External links
 

Polish footballers
1982 births
ŁKS Łódź players
Sportspeople from Tarnów
GKS Bełchatów players
KSZO Ostrowiec Świętokrzyski players
OKS Stomil Olsztyn players
Polonia Warsaw players
Miedź Legnica players
Living people
Association football defenders
Mławianka Mława players
Aluminium Konin players
Zawisza Bydgoszcz players